The Deir ez-Zor Military Council is an Arab-majority militia of the Syrian Democratic Forces (SDF), based in the Deir ez-Zor Governorate.

History 

On 8 December 2016 the Deir ez-Zor Military Council was created during a SDF conference in Hasaka. The members consist of remnants of the former armed rebel council of the same name, expelled from the city by the Islamic State in 2014, having joined the SDF in November 2016. However, the pro-opposition Deir ez-Zor 24 organization denied that the military council's commander, known as Abu Khawla, was a commander in any FSA group.

On 11 December, the council stated that after completing the second phase of the Northern Raqqa offensive they will redirect their focus to Deir ez-Zor Governorate.

On 25 August 2017, 800 fighters left the Elite Forces and were integrated into the ranks of the SDF and its Deir ez-Zor Military Council. The fighters accused the Elite Forces of corruption. These forces consisted of 7 units of al-Baggara and al-Shaitat tribal fighters stationed in the eastern Raqqa and southern Hasaka countrysides,  among them the Gathering of al-Baggara Youth, led by Yasser al-Dahla.

On 28 September 2017, Yasser al-Dahla was arrested by SDF military police, which accused Dahla of not effectively participating in the SDF's Deir ez-Zor offensive and the "lack of military discipline". The Gathering of al-Baggara Youth denied these charges, and accused the Deir ez-Zor Military Council of denying Euphrates Shield fighters who defected to the SDF to join the Gathering. Dahla reportedly threatened to cease his group's participation in the Deir ez-Zor offensive. Some time after that incident, Yasser al-Dahla was released. On 9 December 2017, he denied reports that he defected to government forces, while acknowledging the disputes between him and other SDF commanders.

The Deir ez-Zor Military Council clashed with Syrian pro-government forces during the Battle of Khasham, while some fighters of the military council stated in late February 2018 that they wanted to aid the defense of Afrin Region against the Turkish military operation.

On 20 September 2019, protests broke out in areas held by SDF in Deir ez-Zor calling for the withdrawal of Syrian government and Iranian-aligned forces from 7 kilometers of territory near Khasham, after threats from pro-government and Iranian backed forces in Deir ez-Zor such as the Baqir Brigade to attack SDF held areas in the region. In response to the protests, the council's field commander released a statement on behalf of the Deir ez-Zor Military Council to a tribal gathering, that they would fight pro-government and allied forces if they were to attack. At the same time another SDF spokesman denied that SDF was involved in organizing the protests but admitted that SDF took no action against them.

On 27 September 2019, protests against the government continued, with protestors demanding that the government withdraw from the eastern banks of the Euphrates and hand it over to SDF, and for SDF's fighters to replace government forces in the area.

On 29 October 2019, the CJTF-OIR coalition bombarded Syrian Army positions in Deir ez-Zor, reportedly in response to the Syrian military shelling SDF-held areas in Deir ez-Zor, following the coalition's bombings clashes were also reported between the Syrian army and SDF in the area during which a Syrian army tank was destroyed.

References

2016 establishments in Syria
Military units and factions of the Syrian civil war
Military units and formations established in 2016
Syrian Democratic Forces